The Battle of Agnadello, also known as Vailà, was one of the most significant battles of the War of the League of Cambrai and one of the major battles of the Italian Wars.

Background
On 15 April 1509, a French army under the command of Louis XII left Milan and invaded Venetian territory.  To oppose its advance, Venice had massed a mercenary army near Bergamo, jointly commanded by the Orsini cousins, Bartolomeo d'Alviano and Niccolò di Pitigliano.  The Orsini had orders to avoid a direct confrontation with the advancing French, and spent the next several weeks engaged in light skirmishing.

By 9 May, however, Louis had crossed the Adda River at Cassano d'Adda.  Alviano and Pitigliano, encamped around the town of Treviglio, disagreed on how to deal with Louis, since Alviano wanted to attack the French in defiance of his orders; they finally decided to move south towards the Po River in search of better positions.

Battle
On 14 May, as the Venetian army moved south, Alviano's rearguard, commanded by Piero del Monte and Saccoccio da Spoleto, was attacked by a French detachment under Gian Giacomo Trivulzio, who had massed his troops around the village of Agnadello.  Alviano, who was at Pandino, hurried back to position his forces, numbering around eight thousand, on a ridge overlooking some vineyards. Charles II attempted to attack, first with cavalry and then with Swiss pikemen, but the French, forced to march up a hillside crossed with irrigation ditches, which were soon filled with mud from the pouring rain, were unable to breach the Venetian lines.

Pitigliano had been moving ahead of Alviano, and was several miles away when the French began their attack.  In reply to Alviano's request for help, he sent a note suggesting that a pitched battle should be avoided, and continued his march south.

Meanwhile, Louis, with the remainder of the French army, had reached Agnadello. The French surrounded Alviano on three sides and proceeded to destroy his forces over the next three hours.  The Venetian cavalry charged the center of the French Army to relieve the pressure on the infantry. Despite being initially successful, the Venetian cavalry was soon outnumbered and surrounded; when Alviano himself was wounded and captured the formation collapsed and the surviving knights fled from the battlefield.  Of Alviano's command, more than four thousand were killed, including his commanders Spoleto and del Monte, and 30 pieces of artillery were captured.

Although Pitigliano had avoided engaging the French directly, news of the battle reached him by that evening, and the majority of his forces had deserted by morning.  Faced with the continued advance of the French army, he hurriedly retreated towards Treviso and Venice.  Louis then proceeded to occupy the remainder of Lombardy.

The battle is mentioned in Machiavelli's The Prince, noting that in one day, the Venetians "lost what it had taken them eight hundred years' exertion to conquer."

Aftermath

The economic historian, Niall Ferguson suggests that the collapse in Venetian monte nuovo bonds from 102 percent of their face value to 40 percent was a direct consequence of the Venetians' defeat at Agnadello.

Notes

References

 Machiavelli, Niccolò (1514)  The Prince  Translated by Rufus Goodwin, 2003, Boston: Dante University Press. .
 A Global Chronology of Conflict: From the Ancient World to the Modern Middle East, Vol. II, ed. Spencer C. Tucker, ABC-CLIO, 2010.

External links
 The Battle of Agnadello

1509 in Italy
Agnadello 1509
Agnadello 1509
Agnadello 1509
Agnadello 1509
Agnadello
France–Republic of Venice relations